The National Stud is a United Kingdom Thoroughbred horse breeding farm located two miles from Newmarket. The Stud originated in 1916 as a result of a gift by William Hall Walker (later Lord Wavertree) of the entire bloodstock of his stud farm in Tully, Kildare town in County Kildare, Ireland. As part of the arrangement, the British government acquired the Irish property along with Walker's training stables in England. In 1943, the Irish Government took over the Tully property and the Irish National Stud Company Ltd. was formed. The Irish bloodstock was then transferred to the Sandley Stud in Dorset. The stud's operations were expanded after World War II with the purchase of a stud at West Grinstead in Sussex.

In 1963 the decision was made to sell the Stud's mares and operate only as a stallion station. The two existing breeding farms were sold and operations consolidated into a single new facility built on 500 acres (2 km²) of land at Newmarket.

The National Stud's charity is known as the Wavertree Charitable Trust in William Hall Walker's memory and its Wavertree House contains a number of paintings he donated from his collection of sporting art.

Currently the National Stud facilities accommodates up to eight stallions and as many as 200 broodmares. According to its website, the stud offers a range of services to horse breeders, including stallions at stud, seasonal and permanent boarding, sales preparation and quarantine for export. A partnership between the National Stud and Bottisham Village College was proposed in connection with the school's new Trust Status as of September 2010.

References
 The National Stud official website

British racehorse owners and breeders
Horse racing organisations in Great Britain
Horse farms in the United Kingdom
Newmarket, Suffolk